Michael Steven Rathje (born May 11, 1974) is a Canadian former professional ice hockey defenceman who played 13 seasons in the National Hockey League (NHL) for the San Jose Sharks and Philadelphia Flyers. Rathje was born in Mannville, Alberta, but grew up in Medicine Hat, Alberta.

Playing career
Rathje was selected by the San Jose Sharks 3rd overall in the 1992 NHL Entry Draft and made his NHL debut during the 1993–94 season. After holding out for nearly half of the 2001–02 season, Rathje responded with a career year in the 2002–03 season as he played in all 82 games scoring career highs with 7 goals and 22 assists for 29 points. After spending his first eleven seasons with the Sharks, Rathje signed a five-year contract with the Philadelphia Flyers following the NHL lockout. Shortly into his second season with the Flyers, Rathje was placed on Long Term Injured Reserve (LTI) due to chronic back and hip problems. Rathje attempted to return to the Flyers lineup prior to the 2007–08 season, but was placed on LTI after training camp.

Awards
1991–92: East Second All-Star Team (WHL)
1992–93: East Second All-Star Team (WHL)

Career statistics

Regular season and playoffs

International

External links
 

1974 births
Canadian ice hockey defencemen
Ice hockey people from Alberta
Kansas City Blades players
Living people
Medicine Hat Tigers players
National Hockey League first-round draft picks
Philadelphia Flyers players
San Jose Sharks draft picks
San Jose Sharks players
Sherwood Park Crusaders players
Sportspeople from Medicine Hat